Joey Martin (born July 29, 1988) is a Canadian professional ice hockey player for UK Elite Ice Hockey League (EIHL) side Cardiff Devils. He most recently iced with IceHL side Graz 99ers and was also previously with the Stavanger Oilers in Norway's GET-ligaen.

Early life 
Martin was born in Thorold, Ontario. Martin played junior hockey with the Thorold Blackhawks and Aurora Tigers. Martin played four seasons (2007–2011) of NCAA college hockey with the Nebraska–Omaha Mavericks men's ice hockey team, registering 39 goals, 64 assists, and 116 penalty minutes in 152 games played.

Career 
On September 6, 2011, the Toledo Walleye announced that Martin had signed to play with their ECHL team for the 2011–12 season.

On July 31, 2014, Martin signed his first contract abroad, agreeing to a one-year deal with the Cardiff Devils of the EIHL.

Martin remained with the Cardiff Devils until 2020, even captaining the side in the 2019–20 season, before joining Norwegian GET-ligaen side Stavanger Oilers on August 27, 2020.

He had initially agreed to return to Cardiff for a seventh season but, due to ongoing coronavirus-induced uncertainty over the 2020-21 EIHL season's proposed start date in December, the Devils allowed Martin to seek a temporary move away from the club.

It was expected Martin would stay at Stavanger for a season and return to Cardiff in 2021. However, in May 2021 it was announced Martin would join Austrian side Graz 99ers ahead of the 2021-22 season.

Martin rejoined Cardiff for a second time in May 2022, moving back to the Elite League for the 2022-23 season.

References

External links

1988 births
Living people
Bridgeport Sound Tigers players
Canadian ice hockey centres
Graz 99ers players
Houston Aeros (1994–2013) players
Omaha Mavericks men's ice hockey players
Stockton Thunder players
Texas Stars players
Toledo Walleye players
Cardiff Devils players
Stavanger Oilers players
People from Thorold
Canadian expatriate ice hockey players in the United States
Canadian expatriate ice hockey players in Wales
Canadian expatriate ice hockey players in Norway
Canadian expatriate ice hockey players in Austria